Gabriele Gori (born 13 February 1999) is an Italian footballer who plays as a forward for Reggina, on loan from Fiorentina.

Club career

Fiorentina
He is a product of Fiorentina youth squads and started playing for their Under-19 team in the 2016–17 season. Late in the 2017–18 Serie A season, he made some appearances on the bench for Fiorentina's senior team, but did not see any time on the field.

Loan to Foggia
On 16 July 2018, he joined Serie B club Foggia on a season-long loan. He made his Serie B debut for Foggia on 26 August 2018 in a game against Carpi as a starter. He played 9 league games for Foggia in the first part of the season, 3 of them as a starter.

Loan to Livorno
On 31 January 2019, he moved on another Serie B loan to Livorno.

Loan to Arezzo
On 2 September 2019, he joined Arezzo on loan.

Loan to Vicenza
On 1 September 2020, he was loaned to Vicenza.

Loan to Cosenza
On 13 August 2021, he went to Cosenza on loan.

International career
He was first called up to represent his country in February 2014 for an Italy national under-15 football team friendly. After playing more friendlies for the Under-16 squad, he made appearances for the Under-17 team in the 2016 UEFA European Under-17 Championship qualification, mostly as late substitute. He was not included in the final tournament squad.

For the Under-19 squad, he again made several late-substitute appearances in the 2018 UEFA European Under-19 Championship qualification, but was not included in the final tournament squad.

Honours
Italy U20
FIFA U-20 World Cup fourth place: 2019

References

External links
 

1999 births
Living people
Footballers from Florence
Italian footballers
Italy youth international footballers
Association football forwards
ACF Fiorentina players
Calcio Foggia 1920 players
U.S. Livorno 1915 players
S.S. Arezzo players
L.R. Vicenza players
Cosenza Calcio players
Reggina 1914 players
Serie B players
Serie C players